Monamy Swaine (c.1750–c.1800) was a British painter.  His works are held in collections including the National Maritime Museum. His father was the artist Francis Swaine (c.1715-1782) and his mother, Mary, was the daughter of the artist Peter Monamy (1681-1749).

Swaine specialised in still-life, genre paintings, and marine paintings. He exhibited at the Free Society of Artists from 1769 to 1774.

Gallery
Some of Swaine's paintings:

References

External links

 Monamy Swaine 

1750 births
1800 deaths

Year of birth uncertain
Year of death uncertain
18th-century British painters
British marine artists